Amisha is a given name. Notable people with the name include:

 Amisha Patel (born 1975), Indian Bollywood actress
 Amisha Sethi, Indian author, philanthropist, business leader, and model

See also
 Anisha

Feminine given names